Toto, Peppino and the Fanatics is a 1958 Italian comedy film directed by Mario Mattoli and starring Totò.

Plot
The poor Antonio Vignanelli and Peppino Caprioli are exacerbated by hobby and foibles of their respective families, the two that cause many problems. The two are taken for fools and taken to the asylum, and in fact the director of the asylum (Aroldo Tieri) tells how the various misunderstandings that led to their hospitalization are due in reality the foibles of their families.

Cast
Totò as Antonio Vignanelli
Peppino De Filippo as Peppino Caprioli
Johnny Dorelli as Carlo Caprioli
Alessandra Panaro as la figlia dei Vignanelli
Diana Dei as la moglie del capoufficio
Mario Riva as Peppino's boss
Rosalia Maggio as Anita Vignanelli
Aroldo Tieri as il direttore del manicomio
Enzo Garinei as il giornalista
Giacomo Furia as il cugino di Giovanni
Peppino De Martino as Giovanni
Yvette Masson as Trude, the German tourist
Fanfulla as Giacinti
Renato Carosone as himself
 Anna Campori
 Edda Ferronao

References

External links

1958 films
1950s Italian-language films
Italian black-and-white films
Films directed by Mario Mattoli
Films set in Rome
Italian buddy comedy films
1950s buddy comedy films
1958 comedy films
1950s Italian films